L. tricolor may refer to:
 Leptotyphlops tricolor, the three-colored blind snake, a reptile species
 Lintneria tricolor, a moth species found in Dominica
 Lyriothemis tricolor, a dragonfly species found in Bangladesh, China, India, Japan, Myanmar and Taiwan

See also
 Tricolor (disambiguation)